Malorechensky 2-y is a rural locality (a settlement) in Buravtsovskoye Rural Settlement, Ertilsky District, Voronezh Oblast, Russia. The population was 98 as of 2010. There are 2 streets.

Geography 
Malorechensky 2-y is located 27 km southeast of Ertil (the district's administrative centre) by road. Kopyl is the nearest rural locality.

References 

Rural localities in Ertilsky District